Michael O'Leary (born March 27, 1958) is an American actor. He is perhaps known for playing Rick Bauer in the soap opera Guiding Light, for which he was nominated for a Daytime Emmy Award in 1985.

Early life and education 
O'Leary was born in Saint Paul, Minnesota, and raised in Diamond Bar, California. He majored in television at California State University, Fullerton.

Career 
O'Leary played the character of Dr. Fredrick "Rick" Bauer on Guiding Light from 1983 to 1986, 1987 to 1991, and again from 1995 to 2009, when the series ended. In January 2022, it was announced that O'Leary would appear in Halloween Ends.

Filmography

Film

Television

References

External links

American male film actors
American male soap opera actors
American male television actors
Male actors from Saint Paul, Minnesota
1958 births
Living people
Screenwriters from Minnesota

People from Diamond Bar, California